Professor Ponnuthurai Balasundarampillai is a Sri Lankan Tamil academic and former vice-chancellor of the University of Jaffna.

Early life and family
Balasundarampillaih was educated at the Jaffna Hindu College.

Career
Balasundarampillai was a professor of geography at the University of Jaffna in the 1980s. He was the Dean of the Faculty of Arts at the university from March 1991 to March 1997. He then served as vice-chancellor of the university between February 1997 and April 2003.

References

Academic staff of the University of Jaffna
Alumni of Jaffna Hindu College
Living people
Sri Lankan Tamil academics
Sri Lankan Tamil geographers
Sri Lankan Tamil writers
Vice-Chancellors of the University of Jaffna
Year of birth missing (living people)